Boala is a department or commune of Namentenga Province in northern Burkina Faso. Its capital lies at the town of Boala.

References

Departments of Burkina Faso
Namentenga Province